Bitter Pill may refer to:

Music
Albums
 Bitter Pill (album), 2015 album by Irish singer-songwriter Gavin James

Songs
 "Bitter Pill", a song by Soul Asylum from the 1990 album And the Horse They Rode In On
 "The Bitter Pill" (Warrant song), 1992
 "Bitter Pill", a song by Mötley Crüe from the 1998 album Greatest Hits
 "This Bitter Pill", a song by Dashboard Confessional from the 2001 album The Places You Have Come to Fear the Most
 "Bitter Pill" (Siobhan Fahey song), 2002
 "Bitter Pill", a song by Annie Lennox from the 2003 album Bare
 "The Bitter Pill", a song by The Pineapple Thief from the 2003 album Variations on a Dream
 "Bitter Pill", a song by Silent Civilian from the 2006 album Rebirth of the Temple
 "Bitter Pill", a song by DevilDriver from the 2009 album Pray for Villains
 "Bitter Pill", a song by Gavin James from the 2016 album Bitter Pill

Other
 "The Bitter Pill", a 1971 short story by A. Bertram Chandler
 Bitter Pills, a book by Hans-Peter Martin
 Bitter Pill: Why Medical Bills Are Killing Us, a 2015 book by Steven Brill
 Side Effects (2013 film), a 2013 film which had the working title of The Bitter Pill
 "A Bitter Pill", an episode of Traders
 Bitter Pills, a name used by 22-20s for secret gigs